United Nations Security Council resolution 776, adopted on 14 September 1992, after reaffirming Resolution 743 (1992) and noting offers of assistance made by Member States since the adoption of Resolution 770 (1992), the Council authorised an increase in the size and strength of the United Nations Protection Force in Bosnia and Herzegovina and other areas of the former Yugoslavia.

Under Resolution 776, the Protection Force was to provide protection to humanitarian organisations such as the International Committee of the Red Cross, and other activities as requested by the United Nations High Commissioner for Refugees such as scheduling convoys and negotiating safe passage. The Force would also be permitted to use self-defence if armed persons attempted to prevent it from carrying out its mandate.

The resolution was adopted by 12 votes to none, with 3 abstentions from China, India and Zimbabwe.

See also
 Breakup of Yugoslavia
 Bosnian War
 Croatian War of Independence
 List of United Nations Security Council Resolutions 701 to 800 (1991–1993)
 Slovenian Independence War
 Yugoslav Wars

References

External links
 
Text of the Resolution at undocs.org

 0776
 0776
1992 in Yugoslavia
1992 in Bosnia and Herzegovina
1992 in Croatia
 0776
September 1992 events